Ravindranath Rampaul (born 15 October 1984) is a Trinidadian cricketer. Rampaul has played for Trinidad and Tobago in domestic cricket, in the Indian Premier League for Royal Challengers Bangalore, and in English County cricket for Surrey and Derbyshire. He was born at Preysal in Trinidad and Tobago.

Youth cricket
Rampaul played youth cricket for West Indies and Trinidad and Tobago, playing at the World Under-15 Challenge in England in 2000, and at the 2002 Under-19 World Cup, before breaking the record wicket tally in the regional youth tournament in West Indies after taking 45 wickets in five matches during the 2002 tournament. The following season, he took 27 wickets, as Trinidad and Tobago won their first youth title since 1987. By that time, however, he had also made his first-class debut, playing three Busta Cup matches for Trinidad and Tobago during the 2001–02 season and taking six wickets.

International career
After playing six further matches during the 2002–03 season, and taking 18 wickets, with only Marlon Black taking more for Trinidad and Tobago that season, Rampaul was selected for West Indies Under-19s in the 2003–04 Red Stripe Bowl one-day tournament. Rampaul was leading wicket-taker for the U-19 team, as his eight wickets was double that of any other, and after the tournament completed, Rampaul was called up to represent West Indies in their tour of Zimbabwe in October and November.

Rampaul went wicketless in his first game, sending down 13 no-balls in 30 overs, and was not selected for either of the two Test matches. However, after taking two wickets, including opener Dion Ebrahim, in the one-day warm-up match against Zimbabwe A, Rampaul played in four of the five ODIs. He failed to take a wicket in the series, which West Indies eventually claimed 3–2 with a win in the final game, and Rampaul was the most expensive West Indian bowler among those bowling more than four overs per game,

Rampaul also went to the South African leg of the tour, and recorded his first five-wicket-haul in first-class cricket, taking five of the first six wickets in a tour match against Free State. They were 86 for six after West Indies had posted 618, and Rampaul ended with figures of five for 55. Rampaul played all three tour games, but once again was left out of the Test matches. After "impressing" in a one-day tour match against South Africa A, he was left out of the team for the first ODI, but replaced Vasbert Drakes for the second match after West Indies had lost the first by 209 runs. Rampaul picked up the wicket of Jacques Kallis for 16, and contributed 24 runs, his highest ODI total to date, but was last out as West Indies lost by 16 runs. He removed Kallis again in the final ODI, when West Indies had a chance to level the 5-match series to 2–2 (with one match rained off), but Kallis had already made his best ODI score to date, scoring 135 as South Africa chased the West Indian total of 304 for two. Rampaul's ten overs cost 56 runs, but he was praised for a "marvellous late effort"

After once again playing in the Under-19 World Cup, taking nine wickets as West Indies reached the final but ultimately lost to Pakistan, Rampaul played in all five ODIs against England at home, taking four wickets but once again being the most expensive of the regular bowlers. Between 1 October 1998 and 14 July 2006 only Tino Best conceded more wides and no-balls per ten overs in ODIs for the West Indies.

Injury problems
Rampaul was selected in a 13-man squad to play the first home Test against Bangladesh, but was not selected to play, and one month later, he was struck with injury. He had played three matches during the 2004 NatWest Series, recording his best ODI figures with two wickets, Geraint Jones and Andrew Strauss, for 34 in a seven-wicket win over England, but due to a shin injury he took no further part in the series, and flew home before the Test matches. Rampaul returned to cricket when he turned up in Trinidad league cricket in February 2005, and represented Trinidad and Tobago again during the 2005–06 KFC Cup in October, where he played four matches and was Trinidad and Tobago's leading wicket-taker along with Samuel Badree. However, Rampaul sustained a leg injury, and did not play any games during the first-class Carib Beer Series, which his team won.

Return from injury
In July 2006, Rampaul was awarded a cricket scholarship by the Australian High Commissioner to Trinidad and Tobago, and attended coaching sessions in Australia.

Rampaul became Ireland's overseas player for the 2008 Friends Provident Trophy. He helped them win their first FP Trophy game for two years against Warwickshire. In six matches for Ireland Rampaul took 10 wickets at an average of 28.70, with best bowling figures of 3/40.

Pakistan toured the West Indies in April and May 2011 for a T20I, five ODIs, and two Tests. Osman Samiuddin remarked that during the Tests Rampaul "ran in precisely with the enthusiasm of a man unable to believe how his career has suddenly soared, racing in so the dream doesn't suddenly end". Rampaul was the West Indies leading wicket-taker in the series, with eleven dismissals from two Tests. India began a tour of the West Indies in June. Rampaul was fined 10 per cent of his match fee for the first Test for questioning the umpire's decision when he was given out. He managed ten wickets in the three-match series while conceding 249 runs.

A shoulder injury in March prevented Rampaul from playing domestic cricket for Trinidad and Tobago; a bout of dengue fever the same month prevented him from playing in the ODI series against Australia. He began club cricket towards the end of the month and hoped to represent Trinidad and Tobago to prove his fitness to the national selectors. At last Rampaul was included in the team for the third and final Test after an injury to fellow fast bowler Fidel Edwards.

In September 2021, Rampaul was named in the West Indies' squad for the 2021 ICC Men's T20 World Cup.

Bowling style
Rampaul is well known for his swing bowling, in the words of ESPNcricinfo's Daniel Brettig, "Sending the ball down at brisk pace, Rampaul maintains an immaculate seam position, maximising his chances of early deviation through the air or off the pitch".

References

External links
 
Ravi Rampaul at Royal Challengers Bangalore

1984 births
Living people
Trinidad and Tobago people of Indian descent
Sportspeople of Indian descent
West Indies Test cricketers
West Indies One Day International cricketers
West Indies Twenty20 International cricketers
Cricketers at the 2011 Cricket World Cup
Trinidad and Tobago cricketers
Ireland cricketers
Royal Challengers Bangalore cricketers
Barbados Royals cricketers
Surrey cricketers
Derbyshire cricketers
Trinbago Knight Riders cricketers
Colombo Stars cricketers